Sainte-Eanne, also spelled Sainte-Éanne, is a commune in the French department of Deux-Sèvres, region of Nouvelle-Aquitaine (before 2015: Poitou-Charentes), western France.

See also
Communes of the Deux-Sèvres department

References

Communes of Deux-Sèvres